The Big Ten Conference Men's Soccer Coach of the Year is an annual award given to the top men's college soccer coach in the Big Ten Conference. Indiana head coach Jerry Yeagley was named Coach of the Year a record eight times.

Key

Winners

Winners by school

References 

College soccer trophies and awards in the United States
Coach of the Year
Big Ten
Awards established in 1991